Brittany Gibson (born 18 April 1992) is an Australian rules footballer who played in the AFL Women's for Brisbane between 2017 and 2018 and for North Melbourne between 2019 and 2022.

Early life
Gibson was born in 1992 in Tasmania. She was playing for Burnie Dockers when she was drafted.

AFLW career
Gibson was recruited by Brisbane with the number 141 pick in the 2016 AFL Women's draft. She made her debut in the Lions' inaugural game against  at Casey Fields on 5 February 2017.
In May 2018, Gibson signed with expansion club North Melbourne, to play with the club in the 2019 AFL Women's season. It was revealed she signed on with the club for one more season on 17 June 2021, tying her to the club until the end of the 2022 AFL Women's season. In June 2022, Gibson was delisted by North Melbourne.

Personal life
Gibson lives with her wife Jaime and their son Henry.

References

External links

1992 births
Living people
Sportswomen from Tasmania
Australian rules footballers from Tasmania
Brisbane Lions (AFLW) players
North Melbourne Football Club (AFLW) players
Lesbian sportswomen
Australian LGBT sportspeople
LGBT players of Australian rules football
21st-century LGBT people